Salva cheese from Crema is a PDO table cow's milk cheese made with raw curd. It is a washed-rind cheese that undergoes a medium or long aging period. 

Salva is traditionally eaten in the central plain of Lombardy and produced particularly in the area of Crema, Bergamo, and Brescia. It is also produced in the provinces of Lecco, Lodi, and Milan. Salva has many similarities to Quartirolo, though differs from it by having longer aging and a major aromatic complexity.

Origin of the name
It is also called Salva cremasco (literally, "Salva from Crema") because of its origin and traditional consumption in Crema, although today it is more often produced elsewhere.

History
Its origins date back to the 17th and 18th centuries, when it becomes possible to identify the parallelepiped profile of Salva on some decorative truckles. These truckles were straw-white in color and had a thin crust and very rare eyes (called occhiature), also associated with modern Salva cheese. Salva is closely connected with the seasonal transhumance that bergamini (shepherds from Bergamo) undertook with their cows, coming down from the valleys of Bergamo and Brescia towards farms in the lowlands in autumn, and returning to the valleys in spring. During these trips the cows produced more milk than could be consumed, particularly in spring, necessitating its transformation into strachì da Salva cheese so that it could be preserved in summer. It seems that warlord Bartolomeo Colleoni enjoyed this cheese so much he had some truckles delivered to him during his military inspection of Crema's fortifications.

Production
Full-cream pasteurized milk is used in Salva production. Its coagulation at  lasts 30 minutes. The curd is then chopped twice into very small pieces. Finally, the bulky mass is put in a damp location for 8–16 hours. Aging lasts either 3–5 months (in this case the product has an aromatic and fragrant flavour), or 8–12 months. There are rare truckles aged up to 36 months. Sometimes the crust is flavoured with pomace. The average truckle weighs . The crust is washed with water and salt. Cheeses aged for a longer time are oiled. In the past, linseed oil was used for this purpose. In this way some yellow mildew builds up, penetrating the crust and increasing the flavour. The cheeses are typically branded with the capital letters S and C.

On 21 November 2002, the consortium for the safeguard of the Salva Cremasco was established, and Salva was granted Protected Designation of Origin status due to its uniqueness and traditional method of production.

Uses

Salva and tighe
The most typical preparation of Salva in the Crema area is Salva con le tighe (Salva with pickled green Lombard peppers). The Salva is cut in little cubes and served with tighe cut into large strips without seeds, and a small amount of olive oil. The combination is left to rest before consumption according to taste; it is thought too much oil makes the cheese macerate.

Other preparations
Salva can be used in a variety of dishes from starters to desserts, and from first to second courses.

See also
 List of Italian cheeses

Notes

Bibliography
 Mangià Nustrà, a cura di Daniela Bianchessi e Roberta Schira, Grafin, s.d.
 Ricettario tradizionale di Cremona, Crema, Casalmaggiore, a cura di Marta Bergamaschi, Umberto Soncini Editore.
 Sapori cremaschi, ricette dalla cucina di Crema, raccolte da Marzia Ermentini.
 Ricette da salvare, a cura di Consorzio Tutela Salva Cremasco.

Cow's-milk cheeses
Cheeses with designation of origin protected in the European Union
Italian products with protected designation of origin
Ark of Taste foods
Lombard cheeses